Wang Yuwen (born 28 May 1997) is a Chinese actress.

Career
Wang debuted in the 2016 fantasy campus drama Superstar Academy. She then made her film debut in the youth film Nice To Meet You directed by Gu Changwei, and starred in the youth melodrama Rush to the Dead Summer, based on the novel of the same name written by Guo Jingming.

In 2018, Wang gained attention for starring in the drama film An Elephant Sitting Still. The same year, she starred in the historical drama Secret of the Three Kingdoms, playing the role of Cao Cao's daughter.

In 2020, Wang starred in the fantasy romance drama Novoland: The Castle in the Sky 2  alongside Xu Zhengxi. The same year, she starred in the youth historical romance drama The Chang'an Youth.

Filmography

Film

Television series

Television show

Discography

References

1997 births
Living people
Beijing Dance Academy alumni
21st-century Chinese actresses
Chinese television actresses
Chinese film actresses